Tapinoma annandalei is a species of ant in the genus Tapinoma. Described by William Morton Wheeler in 1928, the species is endemic to India.

References

Tapinoma
Hymenoptera of Asia
Insects of India
Insects described in 1928